The 2009 Speedway Grand Prix was the 64th edition of the official World Championship and the 15th season of the Speedway Grand Prix era, deciding Fédération Internationale de Motocyclisme Speedway World Championship. It is the third series under the promotion of Benfield Sports International, an IMG company.

Qualification 
For the 2008 season, there was the 15 permanent riders, to be joined at each Grand Prix by one wild card and two track reserves.

2008 Grand Prix 

The top eight riders from the 2008 championship qualified as of right. These eight qualifiers are, in championship order:

  (1) Nicki Pedersen
  (2) Jason Crump
  (3) Tomasz Gollob
  (4) Greg Hancock
  (5) Hans Andersen
  (6) Leigh Adams
  (7) Andreas Jonsson
  (8) Rune Holta

Grand Prix Challenge 

The top eight riders from the 2008 championship were joined by three riders who qualified via the Grand Prix Challenge. These riders are, in order by qualifying position:

  (12) Kenneth Bjerre
  (13) Grzegorz Walasek
  (14) Sebastian Ułamek

Nominations 

The final four riders were nominated by series promoters, Benfield Sports International, following the completion of the 2008 season. Riders were nominated after the season ended on October 28, 2008.

  (9) Scott Nicholls
  (10) Fredrik Lindgren
  (11) Chris Harris
  (15) Emil Sayfutdinov

Permanent riders

Calendar 
Calendar is confirmed.

Final classification

See also 
 motorcycle speedway

References

External links 
 SpeedwayWorld.tv – SGP news

 
2009
World Individual